Euchalcia augusta is a moth of the family Noctuidae. It is found from the Taurus Mountains to Lake Van in Turkey. In the Levant it has been recorded from Syria and Israel.

Adults are on wing from April to May. There is one generation per year.

Subspecies
Euchalcia augusta augusta
Euchalcia augusta wolfi (Turkey)

External links
Plusiinae of Israel

Plusiinae
Insects of Turkey
Moths of the Middle East